Philip Drinker (December 12, 1894 – October 19, 1972) was an American industrial hygienist. With Louis Agassiz Shaw, he invented the first widely used iron lung in 1928.

Family and early life
Drinker's father was railroad man and Lehigh University president Henry Sturgis Drinker; his siblings included lawyer and musicologist Henry Sandwith Drinker, Jr., pathologist Cecil Kent Drinker, businessman James Drinker, and biographer Catherine Drinker Bowen.  After graduating from St. George's and Princeton in 1915, Philip Drinker trained as a chemical engineer at Lehigh for two years.

Drinker was hired to teach industrial illumination and ventilation at Harvard Medical School and soon joined his brother Cecil and colleagues Alice Hamilton and David L. Edsall on the faculty of the nascent Harvard School of Public Health in 1921 or 1923.  He studied, taught, and wrote textbooks and scholarly works on a variety of topics in industrial hygiene; the iron lung itself was originally designed in response to an industrial hygiene problem—coal gas poisoning—though it would become best known as a life-preserving treatment for polio. Charles Momsen credited Drinker "and his friends" for their assistance with gas-mixture experiments that ultimately made possible the rescue of the survivors of the USS Squalus in 1939. During World War II, Drinker directed the industrial hygiene program for the United States Maritime Commission. After the war, he advised the Atomic Energy Commission.

Drinker served as editor-in-chief of The Journal of Industrial Hygiene for over thirty years and, in 1942, as president of the American Industrial Hygiene Association, to which he had belonged since its inception.

He retired from Harvard in 1960 or 1961. Drinker received the Donald E. Cummings Award from the American Industrial Hygiene Association in 1950. He was later was inducted into the US National Inventor's Hall of Fame in 2007.

He and his wife Susan had a son, bioengineer Philip A. Drinker, and 2 daughters, Susan Drinker Moran (1926-2010), author, and Eliza Scudder, educator.

Publications

References

1894 births
1972 deaths
20th-century American inventors
Lehigh University alumni
Harvard Medical School faculty
People from Montgomery County, Pennsylvania
Drinker family
Princeton University alumni
St. George's School (Rhode Island) alumni